An industrial steam locomotive is a type of steam locomotive which primarily ran on industrial railways to serve a company by transporting or assisting the manufacturing products of that particular company's produce. Industrial railways often transported items such as coal, iron, slate and workers to aid production. In many countries, industrial steam serving coal mines in particular, lasted significantly longer than the nations otherwise mainline steam traction, due to the readily available fuel.

UK 
The United Kingdom is known for its widespread use of internal and external railways of many different gauges. The most common industrial gauge in the UK was standard gauge. This used  4 ft 8 1⁄2 the most common gauge throughout the world.

Common motive power 
 Steam locomotive 
 Diesel locomotive
 Electric locomotive

Notable builders 
 Avonside Engine Company
 Andrew Barclay Sons & Co.
 Edward Borrows and Sons
 Brush Traction
 English Electric
 George England and Company
 Hawthorn Leslie and Company
 Hudswell Clarke
 Hunslet Engine Company
 Kerr, Stuart and Company
 Kitson and Company 
 Manning Wardle
 North British Locomotive Company
 Peckett and Sons
 Robert Stephenson and Hawthorns
 Robert Stephenson and Company
 Sentinel Waggon Works
 W. G. Bagnall
 Vulcan Foundry
 Yorkshire Engine Company

Notable Locomotive Designs 
 Bagnall 0-4-0ST No. 19
 Bagnall 0-4-0ST "Alfred" and "Judy"
 Bagnall 0-6-0ST Victor/Vulcan
 Hunslet Austerity 0-6-0ST
 Peckett OQ Class

References 

Steam locomotives
Steam locomotives of Great Britain